The Orneau is a river in Belgium. It is a tributary of the Sambre and therefore sub-tributary of the Meuse.

References

Rivers of Belgium